Bryce Aiken (born December 14, 1996) is an American basketball player. He previously played college basketball for the Seton Hall Pirates of the Big East Conference and the Harvard Crimson.

High school career
Raised in Randolph, New Jersey, Aiken played basketball during his freshman year at Pope John XXIII Regional High School in Sparta, New Jersey. While attending Pope John, he became friends with National Basketball Association player Kyrie Irving. For his sophomore year, Aiken transferred to The Patrick School, Irving's former team, in Hillside, New Jersey. He averaged 10.8 points per game as a senior and helped his team to a 64–18 record over three years, including a runner-up finish at the City of Palms Classic. On the Amateur Athletic Union (AAU) circuit, he played for the PSA Cardinals. On October 8, 2015, Aiken committed to play college basketball for Harvard over offers from Miami (Florida) and Seton Hall. He was a consensus four-star recruit and was ranked among the top 100 players in the 2016 class by 247Sports and ESPN.

College career
As a freshman, Aiken was named Ivy League Rookie of the Year and First Team All-Ivy. His 14.5 points per game average was the highest for a Harvard freshman since 1988. He averaged 14.1 points per game as a sophomore. Aiken suffered a left knee injury in loss to Columbia on February 2, 2018 that required offseason surgery. He missed the nonconference section of his junior season before returning on January 21, 2019 against Howard and finished with 16 points. On February 8, Aiken scored a career-high 44 points in a 98–96 triple overtime win over Columbia. As a junior, Aiken averaged 22.2 points, 2.9 rebounds. and 2.6 assists per game on a team that finished 19–12 and lost to NC State in the second round of the NIT. He was named to the First Team All-Ivy League. Coming into his senior season, Aiken was named to the Naismith and Bob Cousy Award watchlists. He scored his 1,000th career point on November 22 in a 82–74 win over Holy Cross and finished with 32 points, hitting 5 of 7 three-pointers. Aiken played just seven games during the 2019–20 season before being sidelined with a season-ending injury. Aiken averaged 16.7 points and 1.7 assists per game in those seven games. On April 9, 2020, Aiken announced that he would transfer to Seton Hall for his senior season, choosing the Pirates over Maryland, Michigan and Iowa State.

After an injury-plagued senior season, Aiken took advantage of the additional year of eligibility granted by the NCAA due to the COVID-19 pandemic. He sprained his ankle in Seton Hall's season-opening loss to Louisville on November 27, and was ruled out for two weeks. On January 15, 2022, he sustained a concussion during a 73-72 loss to Marquette and was ruled out indefinitely. On March 2, Aiken was officially announced to be out for the season. He averaged 14.5 points and 2.7 assists per game.

Career statistics

College

|-
| style="text-align:left;"| 2016–17
| style="text-align:left;"| Harvard
| 26 || 9 || 27.8 || .395 || .349 || .884 || 2.2 || 2.8 || .8 || .0 || 14.5
|-
| style="text-align:left;"| 2017–18
| style="text-align:left;"| Harvard
| 14 || 9 || 27.7 || .375 || .235 || .807 || 2.1 || 2.9 || .3 || .0 || 14.1
|-
| style="text-align:left;"| 2018–19
| style="text-align:left;"| Harvard
| 18 || 17 || 32.8 || .434 || .398 || .855 || 2.9 || 2.6 || 1.2 || .0 || 22.2
|-
| style="text-align:left;"| 2019–20
| style="text-align:left;"| Harvard
| 7 || 6 || 25.6 || .412 || .361 || .872 || 1.9 || 1.7 || 1.3 || .0 || 16.7
|-
| style="text-align:left;"| 2020–21
| style="text-align:left;"| Seton Hall
| 14 || 0 || 14.4 || .319 || .270 || .889 || .9 || 1.5 || .4 || .0 || 5.7
|-
| style="text-align:left;"| 2021–22
| style="text-align:left;"| Seton Hall
| 15 || 6 || 26.2 || .448 || .353 || .825 || 2.1 || 2.7 || 1.3 || .0 || 14.5
|- class="sortbottom"
| style="text-align:center;" colspan="2"| Career
| 94 || 47 || 26.3 || .406 || .342 || .851 || 2.1 || 2.5 || .9 || .0 || 14.8

Personal life
Aiken's father, Daryl, ran track and field for the University of Connecticut, where Aiken's mother, Diana, was a gymnast. His two older brothers played college basketball: Kyle for Lincoln University and Julian for Assumption College.

References

External links
Seton Hall Pirates bio
Harvard Crimson bio

1996 births
Living people
American men's basketball players
Basketball players from New Jersey
Harvard Crimson men's basketball players
People from Randolph, New Jersey
Point guards
Pope John XXIII Regional High School alumni
Seton Hall Pirates men's basketball players
Sportspeople from Morris County, New Jersey
The Patrick School alumni